Saperda scalaris is a species of beetle in the family Cerambycidae. It was described by Carl Linnaeus in 1758, originally under the genus Cerambyx. It has a wide distribution in Europe and Asia. It is preyed upon by parasitoid wasp species including Xorides praecatorius and Helcon angustator.

Subspecies
 Saperda scalaris scalaris (Linnaeus, 1758)
 Saperda scalaris algeriensis Breuning, 1952

References

scalaris
Beetles described in 1758
Taxa named by Carl Linnaeus